Zdunowo (German: Hohenkrug) is a part of the Szczecin City, Poland situated on the right bank of Oder river, east of the Szczecin Old Town, and Szczecin-Dąbie.

Zdunowo